Kniphofia galpinii, called the Galpin red-hot poker, is a species of flowering plant in the genus Kniphofia, native to Eswatini and South Africa. It has gained the Royal Horticultural Society's Award of Garden Merit.

References

galpinii
Flora of Swaziland
Flora of South Africa
Plants described in 1896